Ceroxylon alpinum, also known as the Andean wax palm is a species of palm tree native to Colombia, Ecuador, and Venezuela. It is threatened by habitat loss.

References

alpinum
Flora of the Andes
Flora of Colombia
Flora of Ecuador
Flora of Venezuela
Endangered plants
Taxa named by Aimé Bonpland
Taxonomy articles created by Polbot